Susana Gómez Abaitua (born 5 October 1990), known as Susana Abaitua, is a Spanish film, television and stage actress. She had breakthrough performances in the limited television series Patria and the film Crazy About Her.

Biography 
Susana Gómez Abaitua was born on 5 October 1990 in Vitoria-Gasteiz. One of her grandmothers was French. She trained as a classical dancer and then switched to acting. Abaitua had her debut in a feature film with a performance in Helena Taberna's La buena nueva (2008). She landed her first television role in the miniseries  (2009).  She has since starred in television series such as La pecera de Eva, Vida loca, Sé quién eres, and Patria.

Her stage credits include performances in Yo sí me entero (2012), El primer secreto de Francisca y Raimundo (2014, an adaptation of El secreto de Puente Viejo), La flaqueza del bolchevique and La llamada (2015).

Filmography 
Film

Television

Awards and nominations

References 

1990 births
21st-century Spanish actresses
Spanish film actresses
Spanish television actresses
Spanish stage actresses
Living people
Actresses from the Basque Country (autonomous community)
People from Vitoria-Gasteiz